The 2002 Protection One 400 was the 29th stock car race of the 2002 NASCAR Winston Cup Series and the second iteration of the event. The race was held on Sunday, September 29, 2002, before a crowd of 78,000 in Kansas City, Kansas, at Kansas Speedway, a 1.5 miles (2.4 km) permanent D-shaped oval racetrack. The race took the scheduled 267 laps to complete. At race's end, Jeff Gordon, driving for Hendrick Motorsports, would pull away on the final restart with three laps to go to win his 61st career NASCAR Winston Cup Series win and his third and final win of the season. To fill out the podium, Ryan Newman and Rusty Wallace, both driving for Penske Racing, would finish second and third, respectively.

Background 

Kansas Speedway is a 1.5-mile (2.4 km) tri-oval race track in Kansas City, Kansas. It was built in 2001 and hosts two annual NASCAR race weekends. The NTT IndyCar Series also raced there until 2011. The speedway is owned and operated by the International Speedway Corporation.

Entry list 

 (R) denotes rookie driver.

Practice

First practice 
The first practice session was held on Friday, September 27, at 11:20 AM CST, and would last for 2 hours.

Second practice 
The second practice session was held on Saturday, September 28, at 9:30 AM CST, and would last for 45 minutes.

Third and final practice 
The third and final practice session, sometimes referred to as Happy Hour, was held on Saturday, September 28, at 11:15 AM CST, and would last for 45 minutes.

During the opening minutes of the session, Joe Gibbs Racing driver Bobby Labonte would crash in turn two, forcing the team to go to a backup car.

Qualifying 
Qualifying was held on Friday, September 27, at 3:05 PM CST. Each driver would have two laps to set a fastest time; the fastest of the two would count as their official qualifying lap. Positions 1-36 would be decided on time, while positions 37-43 would be based on provisionals. Six spots are awarded by the use of provisionals based on owner's points. The seventh is awarded to a past champion who has not otherwise qualified for the race. If no past champion needs the provisional, the next team in the owner points will be awarded a provisional.

Three drivers would fail to qualify: Brett Bodine, Kirk Shelmerdine, and Carl Long.

Full qualifying results

Race results

References 

2002 NASCAR Winston Cup Series
NASCAR races at Kansas Speedway
September 2002 sports events in the United States
2002 in sports in Kansas